Nagan O clan was one of the Korean clans. Their Bon-gwan was in Suncheon, South Jeolla Province. According to the research in 2000, the number of Nagan O clan was 9135. O Cheom came over from China to Silla during Jijeung of Silla’s reign in Silla dynasty.  was appointed as Prince of Nagan and began Nagan O clan because he defeated enemies when he served as government official during Goryeo period.

See also 
 Korean clan names of foreign origin

References

External links 
 

 
Korean clan names of Chinese origin